Cherry Ridge is a ridge located in the Catskill Mountains of New York northwest of Roscoe. Morton Hill is located southeast of Cherry Ridge and Fuller Hill is located west-northwest.

References

Mountains of Delaware County, New York
Mountains of New York (state)